Bahçecik is a Yazidi village located in the Sur district of the Diyarbakır Province in southeastern Turkey. The village is located ca.  east of Diyarbakır in southeastern Anatolia.

References 

Villages in Diyarbakır Province
Yazidi villages in Turkey